"Not in the Mood" is a song by American rapper Lil Tjay featuring vocals from fellow American rappers Fivio Foreign and Kay Flock. It was released as a single on October 22, 2021, and was produced by BS Beats and AyoAA.

Composition
"Not in the Mood" is a drill song that sees the artists rapping about their determination to work harder, success and "overcome life's obstacles", as well as their lifestyles and street life.

Music video
The music video, released alongside the single, was filmed in New York. In it, the rappers and their respective crews appear in the studio, outside apartments and on the streets of Times Square.

Charts

References

2021 singles
2021 songs
Lil Tjay songs
Fivio Foreign songs
Kay Flock songs
Columbia Records singles
Songs written by Fivio Foreign
Songs written by Lil Tjay